The Notley Ministry was the combined Cabinet (called Executive Council of Alberta), chaired by 17th Premier of Alberta Rachel Notley, that governed Alberta from May 24, 2015 to April 30, 2019. It was made up of members of the New Democratic Party (NDP).

Cabinet composition and shuffles
The initial cabinet of the Notley ministry was sworn in on May 24, 2015. It consisted of 12 members, including Notley herself, and had an equal number of men and women. Several ministers held multiple portfolios, including Notley, who was also sworn in as minister of international and intergovernmental affairs.

On October 22, 2015, Notley appointed Deron Bilous to head the newly-created Ministry of Economic Development and Trade, which oversees all of the province's international trade offices and trade initiatives. Consequently, Lori Sigurdson's portfolio was adjusted from Innovation and Advanced Education to Advanced Education, and Danielle Larivee took over Bilous' old roles as minister of Municipal Affairs and Service Alberta.

on February 2, 2016, Notley initiated a major cabinet shuffle, adding six new ministers: Richard Feehan, Christina Gray, Stephanie McLean, Ricardo Miranda, Brandy Payne and Marlin Schmidt. Explaining the expansion, Notley said "It was never our plan to keep the cabinet [at 12 ministers] … It was our plan to focus on our priorities and get a lay of the land and establish a key overarching framework," and that it was necessary to spread out duties and responsibilities as the government implemented more changes. To that end, Feehan and Miranda both split an existing minister's workload (Miranda taking culture and tourism from Eggen, who remained minister of education; and Feehan taking the indigenous relations file from Ganley, who remained minister of justice), while Payne was named associate minister of health. Sigurdson moved to the new portfolio of seniors and housing, with her old portfolios (advanced education and labour) assigned to Gray and Schmidt, respectively. McLean replaced Larivee at Services Alberta, who moved to municipal affairs. Additionally, health minister Sarah Hoffman was elevated to Deputy Premier.

Notley made two small shuffles in 2017. On January 19, Notley created a new Department of Children's Services out of the Human Services Department, and named Larivee as its first minister; the remaining human services ministry, still headed by Irfan Sabir, was renamed "Ministry of Community and Social Services". Shayne Anderson succeeded Larivee as minister of municipal affairs. On October 17, Sandra Jansen was appointed to cabinet as minister of Infrastructure, taking over from Brian Mason; Mason remained minister of Transportation.

On June 18, 2018, Notley dropped Payne and McLean after they announced they would not run for re-election. Brian Malkinson was named the new minister of Service Alberta, while Larivee took McLean's responsibility for status of women.

List of ministers

List of ministers by portfolio

List of ministers by minister

See also 
 Executive Council of Alberta
 List of Alberta provincial ministers

Notes

References

Politics of Alberta
Executive Council of Alberta
2015 establishments in Alberta
Cabinets established in 2015
2019 disestablishments in Alberta
Cabinets disestablished in 2019